GM3 (monosialodihexosylganglioside) is a type of ganglioside. The letter G refers to ganglioside, and M is for monosialic acid as it has one sialic acid only.  The numbering is based on its relative mobility in electrophoresis among other monosialic gangliosides.  Its structure can be condensed to NANA-Gal-Glc-ceramide. GM3 is the most common membrane-bound glycosphingolipid in tissues, composed of three monosaccharide groups attached to a ceramide backbone. GM3 serves as a precursor for other, more complex gangliosides. Like other gangliosides, GM3 is synthesized in the Golgi apparatus. It is then transported to the plasma membrane, where it functions in cellular signaling. GM3 also functions as an inhibitor; it inhibits cell growth, the function of growth factor receptors, and generation of cytokines by T cells.

Applications in Cancer Treatment 
The immunologic function of GM3 in inhibiting proliferation has resulted in its usage in the study of cancer biology and cancer treatments. GM3 has been found to reduce the motility of ovarian cancer cells, colorectal cancer cells, and gastric cancer cells. High amounts of GM3 also displayed a high amount of caveolin-1, a molecule which has been shown to inhibit ovarian cancer growth. In bladder cancer cells, GM3 show antiproliferative effects. Increased concentrations of GM3 in bladder cancer cells reduces the malignancy potential of those cells and induces apoptosis. The addition of GM3 to bladder cancer cells also decreases their cell adhesion and inhibits tumor growth. Due to its role in inhibiting cancer growth, GM3 is a target of cancer treatments. The chemotherapy drug cisplatin functions by inducing GM3-mediated apoptosis of cancer cells.

References

Glycolipids